David Charles Hahn (October 30, 1976 – September 27, 2016), sometimes called the "Radioactive Boy Scout" or the "Nuclear Boy Scout", was an American nuclear radiation enthusiast who built a homemade neutron source at the age of seventeen.

A scout in the Boy Scouts of America, Hahn conducted his experiments in secret in a backyard shed at his mother's house in Commerce Township, Michigan. Hahn's goal was to build and demonstrate a homemade breeder reactor. While he never managed to build a reactor, in August 1994, Hahn's progress attracted the attention of local police when they found material in his vehicle that troubled them during a stop for a separate matter. When Hahn warned them that the material was radioactive, the police contacted federal authorities. His mother's property was cleaned up by the Environmental Protection Agency (EPA) ten months later as a Superfund cleanup site. Hahn attained Eagle Scout rank shortly after his lab was dismantled.

While the incident was not widely publicized initially, it became better known following a 1998 Harper's Magazine article by journalist Ken Silverstein. Hahn was also the subject of Silverstein's 2004 book The Radioactive Boy Scout.  As an adult, Hahn served in the United States Navy and United States Marine Corps. He was subsequently treated for mental illness, and his death at age 39 was related to drug and alcohol use.

Background

Hahn was born in Royal Oak, Michigan.

Creation of the neutron source
Hahn was fascinated by chemistry and spent years conducting amateur chemistry experiments, which sometimes caused small explosions and other mishaps. He was inspired in part by reading The Golden Book of Chemistry Experiments and tried to collect samples of every element in the periodic table, including the radioactive ones. He later received a merit badge in Atomic Energy and became fascinated with the idea of creating a breeder reactor in his home. Hahn diligently amassed radioactive material by collecting small amounts from household products, such as americium from smoke detectors, thorium from camping lantern mantles, radium from clocks, and tritium from gunsights. His "reactor" was a bored-out block of lead, and he used lithium from $1,000 worth of purchased batteries to purify the thorium ash using a Bunsen burner.

Hahn ultimately hoped to create a breeder reactor, using low-level isotopes to transform samples of thorium and uranium into fissile isotopes.

His homemade neutron source was often incorrectly referred to as a reactor, but it did emit measurable levels of radiation, likely exceeding 1,000 times normal background radiation. Alarmed, Hahn began to dismantle his experiments, but in a chance encounter, police discovered his activities, which triggered a Federal Radiological Emergency Response Team involving the FBI and the Nuclear Regulatory Commission. On June 26, 1995, the EPA, having designated Hahn's mother's property a Superfund hazardous materials cleanup site, dismantled the shed and its contents and buried them as low-level radioactive waste in Utah. Unknown to officials, his mother, fearful that she would lose her house if the full extent of the radiation were known, had already collected the majority of the radioactive material and thrown it away in the conventional garbage. Hahn refused medical evaluation for radiation exposure. EPA scientists believed that Hahn's life expectancy may have been shortened due to his exposure to radioactivity, particularly since he spent long periods in the small, enclosed shed with large amounts of radioactive material and only minimal safety precautions, but he refused their recommendation that he be examined at the Enrico Fermi Nuclear Generating Station.

Career
Hahn became depressed after the scandal, a problem exacerbated by the breakup with his then-girlfriend and the suicide of his mother in early 1996. While he did graduate from high school, he lacked any direction or plans thereafter. His father and stepmother first encouraged him to attend Macomb Community College. He enrolled in a metallurgy program there, but frequently skipped classes. He was then encouraged to join the military, so he enlisted in the Navy, assigned to the nuclear-powered aircraft carrier  as an undesignated seaman (pay grade E-3). After a four-year tour, he achieved interior communications specialist with a rank of petty officer, third class (pay grade E-4).

After his time on USS Enterprise, Hahn enlisted in the Marine Corps and was stationed in North Carolina. After a few years, Hahn achieved the rank of lance corporal (E-3).  Shortly after returning from a rotation in Japan, he was honorably discharged on medical grounds and returned to Michigan.

FBI investigation
On April 23, 2007, the FBI received a lead regarding Hahn's alleged possession of a second neutron source in his freezer. Contacted via telephone, Hahn insisted that he was not in possession of radioactive material. The FBI decided no imminent terrorist threat was present but decided to attempt a personal interview. During an interview at an FBI office on May 16, 2007, investigators' questions touched on a variety of topics, such as flyers that Hahn had distributed promoting his book and upcoming film; theft of tires and rims from a vehicle prior to his Navy service; a diagnosis of paranoid schizophrenia; and a few less significant topics. FBI agents then interviewed an individual (whose identity was not released) who stated that Hahn was using cocaine heavily, was not taking his prescribed medication, was paranoid about people who he claimed "had the ability to 'shock' his genitals with their minds", and had possibly been visited by prostitutes. The individual also stated that he believed that Hahn was still trying to build a reactor and was collecting radium. He stated that he did not believe Hahn had any intentions of hurting anyone but was concerned about his mental state.

This investigation is likely what led to Hahn's arrest regarding larceny of smoke alarms.

Larceny of smoke detectors
On August 1, 2007, Hahn was charged with larceny in Clinton Township, Michigan for allegedly removing a number of smoke detectors from the halls of his apartment building. His intention was to obtain americium from them. In his mug shot, his face was covered with sores, which investigators believed could have been from exposure to radioactive materials, psoriasis, or possible drug use. During a Circuit Court hearing, Hahn pleaded guilty to attempted larceny of a building. The court's online docket said prosecutors recommended that he be sentenced to time served and enter an inpatient treatment facility. Under terms of the plea, the original charge of larceny of a building would be dismissed at sentencing, scheduled for October 4. He was sentenced to 90 days in jail for attempted larceny. Court records stated that his sentence would be delayed by six months while Hahn underwent medical treatment in the psychiatric unit of Macomb County Jail.

Death
On September 27, 2016, at the age of 39, Hahn died in his hometown of Shelby Charter Township, Michigan. His death was ruled an accidental result of intoxication from the combined effects of alcohol, diphenhydramine, and fentanyl.

In popular culture 
The incident received scant media attention at the time, but was widely disseminated after writer Ken Silverstein published an article about the incident in Harper's Magazine in 1998. In 2004 he expanded it into a book, The Radioactive Boy Scout, which was optioned for a feature film in 2016.

In 1999, University of Chicago physics majors Justin Kasper and Fred Niell, as part of a scavenger hunt that had as one of its items "a breeder reactor built in a shed," successfully built a similar nuclear reactor that produced trace amounts of plutonium.

In the CSI: NY episode "Page Turner", the character Lawrence Wagner is based on Hahn.

A television documentary, The Nuclear Boy Scout, aired on Channel 4 in the United Kingdom in 2003. In it, Hahn reenacted some of his methods for the camera.

Hahn's experiments inspired others to attempt similar feats, particularly Taylor Wilson, who at age 14 became the youngest person to produce nuclear fusion.

Michael Stevens featured Hahn's story in his Vsauce YouTube video "Cruel Bombs".

StarQuest Production Network(SQPN)'s mystery program Jimmy Akin Mysterious World, dedicated episode #92 on Hahn called "The Radioactive Boy Scout".

An episode of the CBS series Young Sheldon features the protagonist attempting to build a nuclear reactor by extracting americium from smoke detectors.

Duncan Jones claimed that the villain in his sci-fi film Source Code was inspired by the documentary The Nuclear Boy Scout.

Episode 20 of The Dollop Podcast covers Hahn's exploits. 

The song “Baby Criminal” by Swedish post-punk band Viagra Boys from their 2022 studio album Cave World is loosely based on Hahn’s life.

See also
Richard Handl
Taylor Wilson

References

Further reading
 An analysis is given of some of Hahn's work by Ghiorso, who has been involved in the discovery of about a dozen transuranium elements.

External links

David Hahn the Boy Who Built a Nuclear Reactor in His Garden

Macomb Community College alumni
Military personnel from Michigan
People from Clinton, Macomb County, Michigan
People from Commerce, Michigan
People from Royal Oak, Michigan
United States Marines
United States Navy sailors
1976 births
2016 deaths
Accidental deaths in Michigan
Drug-related deaths in Michigan
Alcohol-related deaths in Michigan